Massachusetts Senate's 1st Worcester district in the United States is one of 40 legislative districts of the Massachusetts Senate. It covers portions of Worcester county. Democrat Robyn Kennedy of Worcester has represented the district since 2023.

Locales represented
The district includes the following localities:
 Boylston
 part of Clinton
 Holden
 part of Northborough
 Princeton
 West Boylston
 part of Worcester

Senators 

 Elmer Potter
 James Harrop
 Christian Nelson
 John S. Sullivan, circa 1935 
 Charles F. Jeff Sullivan, circa 1945 
 William Daniel Fleming, circa 1957 
 Vite Pigaga

Images
Portraits of legislators

See also
 List of Massachusetts Senate elections
 List of Massachusetts General Courts
 List of former districts of the Massachusetts Senate
 Other Worcester County districts of the Massachusett Senate: 2nd; Hampshire, Franklin and Worcester; Middlesex and Worcester; Worcester, Hampden, Hampshire and Middlesex; Worcester and Middlesex; Worcester and Norfolk
 Worcester County districts of the Massachusetts House of Representatives: 1st, 2nd, 3rd, 4th, 5th, 6th, 7th, 8th, 9th, 10th, 11th, 12th, 13th, 14th, 15th, 16th, 17th, 18th

References

External links
 Ballotpedia
 . State Senate district information based on U.S. Census Bureau's American Community Survey.
 League of Women Voters of the Worcester Area

Senate
Government in Worcester County, Massachusetts
Massachusetts Senate